Wellington Porter McFail (aka W. P. McPhail; January 30, 1892 – February 7, 1965) was a pioneering pilot, barnstormer, wing walker, airline and air mail pilot, and one of only ten recipients of the Airmail Flyers' Medal of Honor.

Born 30 January 1892, W.P. was the youngest of four children born to Francis Robert McFail and Elsie Elizabeth Irons, in Portage, Wisconsin.  His mother died when he was only 4 years old and his father remarried Allie "Olive" J Lintner.

Career
His World War I draft card shows he was working as a Locomotive Fireman for the Chicago, Milwaukee, St. Paul and Pacific Railway out of Great Falls, Montana.  After World War I he joined up with a flying circus barnstorming as a wing walker and began his lifelong carrier with flying.

May 1, 1928 W. P. McFail began flying for American Airways Company.   In 1934 American Airways slipped into financial straits and was acquired by corporate raider Errett Lobban Cord.  After the acquisition American Airways Company was renamed American Airlines.

On page 18 of the July 18, 1938 issue of Time Magazine, McFail is one of 10 "ace" pilots mentioned for having a decade a peace of safe airmail / passenger travel.  A special poster was created by American Airlines touting the achievement by the pilots and McFail was one of two specifically talked about in the quarter page article.

"Blond, handsome Wellington McFail has known the most adventure.  He started his career as a wing-walker with a barnstorming air circus.  One day in 1933 he was flying a transport plane over Texas when the entire nose suddenly cracked and fell, carrying the engine with it, McFail managed to bring the fuselage safely to earth, was awarded a medal for "extraordinary achievement."  

By December 1, 1939 McFail was the 7th most senior pilot at American Airlines.

McFail died at a Fort Worth hospital in 1965.

Flight incident
December 6, 1933 McFail was making the short flight from Texarkana, Texas to Dallas, Texas flying an Orion with a load of Airmail.  Just 40 minutes into the routine flight the nose of the aircraft, with the entire engine, broke loose and fell from the air craft.   McFail prepared to parachute from the doomed aircraft but was able to regain some control and made an emergency landing, saving all of the airmail on board.  

For this feat, on 29 October 1935 at a ceremony (12:00–12:15) in the White House, McFail was one of seven aviators awarded the Airmail Flyers' Medal of Honor by President Franklin Delano Roosevelt for extraordinary achievement. All seven had saved the mail by making hazardous landings. Present at the ceremony were: President Franklin Delano Roosevelt; Postmaster General James A Farley; Lewis S. Turner of Fort Worth, Texas; James H. Carmichael, Jr. of Detroit, Michigan; Edward A. Bellande of Los Angeles, California; Gordon S. Darnell of Kansas City, Missouri; Willington P. McFail of Murfreesboro, Tennessee; Roy H. Warner of Portland, Oregon; and Grover Tyler of Seattle, Washington.  McFail's deed was chronicled on the well-known Wheaties cereal box cover as part of a series of eight box covers regarding the feats of pilots awarded the Air Mail Flyers Medal of Honor.

Medal citation

References

External links
 H.R.101
 Public law 661
 Public law 91-375 (12 Aug. 1970)
 Apropriations A-35875 April 2, 1931, 10 Comp.Gen.543
 JOMSA article 1990 Vol. 141.3.13
 JOMSA article 1953 May - Aug
 JOMSA article 1966 Vol. 17.12.7
 NASM Medal image (Silver)
 NASM Medal image (Bronze)
 Find A Grave memorial of Wellington Porter McFail

1892 births
1965 deaths
Aviators from Wisconsin
United States airmail pilots
Wing walkers
People from Portage, Wisconsin